MOA-2007-BLG-192L is a low-mass red dwarf star or brown dwarf, approximately 3,000 light-years away in the constellation of Sagittarius.  It is estimated to have a mass approximately 6% of the Sun's.  In 2008, an Earth-sized extrasolar planet was announced to be orbiting this object.

Planetary system 
The discovery of a planet, MOA-2007-BLG-192Lb, orbiting this object was announced on June 2, 2008.  This planet, with a mass of approximately 3.3 times that of Earth, is one of the smallest known extrasolar planets.  It was found when it caused a gravitational microlensing event on the night of May 24, 2007, which was detected as part of the MOA-II gravitational microlensing survey at the Mount John University Observatory in New Zealand.

See also 

 HD 181433
 HD 40307
 HD 47186
 MOA-2007-BLG-400L
 OGLE-2005-BLG-390L

References

External links 
 
 

Sagittarius (constellation)
Planetary systems with one confirmed planet
Gravitational lensing